Marc Fiorini (born 1940 or 1941) is an Italian-born Canadian actor. He is best known for his appearances in Italian films, and his roles in the television series Big Wolf on Campus and the film Angels & Demons.

Biography
Fiorini was born in Italy. After World War II, he went to Québec, Canada with his mother to live there with his grandparents. He studied theoretical physics and aeronautical engineering but eventually decided to become an actor instead. After studying at the National Theatre School of Canada and working on stage in Canada and in London, Fiorini went to his country of birth to try his hand at Italian films. He lived for several years in Italy where he appeared in genre films, sometimes using aliases such as Ludovico Svengali, Matt Silence, Mark Farran and  Ashborn Hamilton Jr. In 1969, while playing the main villain in the Spaghetti Western The Reward's Yours... The Man's Mine, he met expatriate American actress Lisa Seagram, whom he later married.  

Fiorini later relocated to North America where he worked as a character actor. After a hiatus from the screen, he resumed his career in the late 1990s. He has returned to Italy numerous times to work in local productions. He played the Werewolf Syndicate Leader in the Canadian television series Big Wolf on Campus (1999-2002) and Cardinal Baggia in Angels & Demons (2009).

Selected filmography
 1968 : Roma come Chicago
 1968 : Kong Island (Eva, la Venere selvaggia)
 1969  : The Reward's Yours... The Man's Mine (El Puro)
 1974 : I cannoni tuonano ancora
 1976  : La studentessa
 1977  : Tentacles
 1990 : Down the Drain
 1992 : Out of Control
 1993 : American Ninja V
 1999-2002 : Big Wolf on Campus (television series)
2002 : La guerra è finita (TV movie)
 2003 : Red Riding Hood
 2003 : Ferrari
 2005 : Pope John Paul II (television miniseries)
 2006 : Gli indesiderabili
 2006 : Fuoco su di me
 2006 : The Listening
 2007 : Silk
 2008 : Capri (television series)
2009 : Angels & Demons
2017 : The Broken Key
2019 : Aquile randagie
2019 : Credo in un solo padre
2020 : Creators: The Past

References

External links 
 

1940s births
Living people
Canadian male film actors
Canadian male television actors
Italian emigrants to Canada
National Theatre School of Canada alumni